The 33rd parallel south is a circle of latitude that is 33 degrees south of the Earth's equatorial plane. It crosses the Atlantic Ocean, Africa, the Indian Ocean, Australasia, the Pacific Ocean and South America.

Around the world
Starting at the Prime Meridian and heading eastwards, the parallel 33° south passes through:

{| class="wikitable plainrowheaders"
! scope="col" width="125" | Co-ordinates
! scope="col" | Country, territory or ocean
! scope="col" | Notes
|-
| style="background:#b0e0e6;" | 
! scope="row" style="background:#b0e0e6;" | Atlantic Ocean
| style="background:#b0e0e6;" |
|-valign="top"
| 
! scope="row" | 
| Western Cape Eastern Cape - passing through East London at 
|-
| style="background:#b0e0e6;" | 
! scope="row" style="background:#b0e0e6;" | Indian Ocean
| style="background:#b0e0e6;" |
|-
| 
! scope="row" | 
| Western Australia
|-
| style="background:#b0e0e6;" | 
! scope="row" style="background:#b0e0e6;" | Indian Ocean
| style="background:#b0e0e6;" | Great Australian Bight
|-valign="top"
| 
! scope="row" | 
| South Australia New South Wales
|-
| style="background:#b0e0e6;" | 
! scope="row" style="background:#b0e0e6;" | Pacific Ocean
| style="background:#b0e0e6;" |
|-
| 
! scope="row" | 
| Valparaíso Region – passing through Viña del Mar (at )Santiago Metropolitan RegionValparaíso Region
|-
| 
! scope="row" | 
| Mendoza ProvinceSan Luis ProvinceCórdoba ProvinceSanta Fe ProvinceEntre Ríos Province
|-
| 
! scope="row" | 
|
|-
| 
! scope="row" | 
| Rio Grande do Sul
|-
| style="background:#b0e0e6;" | 
! scope="row" style="background:#b0e0e6;" | Atlantic Ocean
| style="background:#b0e0e6;" |
|}

See also
32nd parallel south
34th parallel south

s33